Scolopterus penicillatus, also known as the black spined weevil, is an endemic beetle of New Zealand. The beetle is present throughout New Zealand and can be discovered by beating native flowering plants in the summer months. In appearance it is a shining black colour with a purplish tinge and looks very similar to its close relative Scolopterus tetracanthus. S. penicillatus can be distinguished from S. tetracanthus as the spines on the shoulders of the former are much less pointed. Adult black spined weevils have been collected from Hedychium gardnerianum and caught in the flowers of Helichrysum lanceolatum. The larvae of S. penicillatus are known to develop in the recently dead bark of the various species of Pseudopanax.

References 

Beetles of New Zealand
Beetles described in 1846
Endemic fauna of New Zealand
Curculioninae
Endemic insects of New Zealand